Running Scared is a six-part British television children's drama series, transmitted between 15 January and 19 February 1986, that was based on the Bernard Ashley novel of the same name.

The series, primarily set in Forest Gate, focuses on a teenage girl, Paula Prescott (Julia Millbank), whose life is put at risk when she uncovers evidence that could put a local criminal gang leader Charlie Elkin (Christopher Ellison) behind bars. The series was filmed in and around Green Lane in Dagenham; Queen's Market in Upton Park; First Avenue in Manor Park; and The Greyhound public house in Warley, Essex. The Woolwich Ferry also features in a key scene.

The series was notable for its use of the Kate Bush single Running Up That Hill (A Deal with God) being used as the main title theme, and part of the original video being re-imagined for use within the programme's title sequence. Another notable track used for the series was "Chemistry" by Brian Eno and Jon Hassell from their 1980 collaboration Fourth World, Vol. 1: Possible Musics.

Creator Ashley used the story to highlight the ever-growing Sikh community in London, which had been rarely touched upon in mainstream television up to this point. A TV-tie in version of the novel was issued a week prior to broadcast on 9 January 1986. A digitally remastered version of the series was released on DVD in Australia in 2014.

Cast
 Julia Millbank as Paula Prescott
 Christopher Ellison as Charlie Elkin
 Hetty Baynes as Leila
 James Cosmo as Detective Inspector McNeill
 Amarjit Dhillon as Narinder Sidhu
 Renu Setna as Pratap Singh Sidhu
 Rani Singh as Kamal Kaur Sidhu 
 Desmond McNamara as Mick Prescott
 Maureen Sweeney as Dolly Prescott
 Tony Caunter as Frank Butler
 Alan Ford as Ron Martin
 Alan Talbot as Fred Barratt
 Simon Adams as Brian Butler
 Jason Norman as Tommy
 Damon Doyle as Scott
 Anthony Gorry as Dean Prescott
 Fred Bryant as Sam "Grandad" Prescott

Episodes

References

External links
 

BBC children's television shows
1980s British children's television series
1986 British television series debuts
1986 British television series endings
Television shows set in London